Petergate is a street in the city centre of York, in England.  It is divided into High Petergate and Low Petergate. The well-known view of the Minster from Low Petergate is described by the City of York Council as "excellent".

History
Petergate generally follows the course of the via principalis of Roman Eboracum, which ran from the Porta Principalis Dextra, now Bootham Bar, to the Porta Principalis Sinistra, in what is now King's Square.  The main deviation from the Roman route is around its junction with Grape Lane, and this has been associated with destruction occurring when the Great Heathen Army entered York in 866.  Based on archaeological records, the York Civic Trust argues that the street fell out of use immediately after the Roman period, but was re-established while the Roman walls still survived.  This may have been as early as 627, when the first York Minster was built.  In its early years, the minster had a large cemetery, which extended as far as Petergate, around its junction with Stonegate.

The current property boundaries largely date from the 10th century, and the street has always been a desirable area, with its junction with Stonegate a particularly high-status location.  In the Mediaeval period, the street lay immediately outside the precinct of the minster.  As the minster is dedicated to Saint Peter, this led to the name "Petergate", which was first recorded in about 1190.  In 1283, a wall was constructed around the precinct, with gateways opposite Duncombe Place and Stonegate.  Buildings on the north-east side of the street were built up against the wall.  Almost the whole street lay within the parish of St Michael-le-Belfrey, the church, on the street and next to the Minster, having been first recorded in 1294.

The street remained important over the following centuries, and in the 17th century, the Talbot Inn was established, one of the main inns in the city.  In the 18th- and 19th-centuries, parts of the street were rebuilt, and buildings around the front of York Minster were demolished, to open up access to it.  Despite this, numerous Mediaeval buildings survive, all in commercial use.

Layout and architecture

High Petergate starts at Bootham Bar on the York city walls, where Bootham terminates, and it runs south-east. Immediately beside the walls is the grade-II listed building at 2–2A High Petergate, built around 1840 and today occupied by The Fat Badger inn. The Hole-in-the-Wall snickelway (also known as Little Peculiar Lane), the shortest official snickelway in the city, leads off its north-east side.  At the front of York Minster, it opens up to form a major junction with Duncombe Place, Precentor's Court and Minster Yard, with access also to Dean's Park.  The next junction is with Stonegate and Minster Gates, past which the street continues as Low Petergate.  Grape Lane leads off the south-west side, as does the snickelway Lund's Court, while another snickelway, Hornpot Lane, leads off the north-east side.  The street ends at King's Square, where it meets Church Street and Goodramgate.  Until the creation of King's Square, in the 18th century, it was considered to continue slightly further, to a junction with St Andrewgate, Colliergate and King's Court.

On High Petergate, notable buildings on the north-east side include 4 High Petergate, built in 1782 and possibly designed by Peter Atkinson; 8 High Petergate, with a 14th-century roof truss; the Hole in the Wall pub, mostly 18th-century but with some earlier timber framing; 12–18 High Petergate, an early-20th century range built in imitation of an earlier building which stood on the site; 24–36 High Petergate, facing the Minster, built in 1838 but incorporating parts of a Georgian building; and St Michael-le-Belfrey church.  On the south-west side lie 3 High Petergate, mostly early 18th-century but with some earlier timber framing; 5 High Petergate, with 16th-century origins; the 16th-century 7 High Petergate; the 17th-century Eagle & Child pub; the large 18th-century Petergate House; and the 17th-century 17–19 High Petergate.  Beyond Duncombe Place are the grade I listed 23 High Petergate; 25–29 High Petergate, built in the 1700s; 31 High Petergate, with 15th-century origins; and the timber-framed 33–35 High Petergate.

The street numbering continues in Low Petergate, and on the north-east side lie 48–50 Low Petergate, with some Mediaeval stonework in the basement; the 18th-century Adams House; 56–60 Low Petergate, built by John Stockdale in about 1500; the former York College for Girls; 64 and 66 Low Petergate, incorporating part of the former Talbot Inn, and with 15th-century origins; the 15th-century 76 Low Petergate; and 17th-century 78 Low Petergate.  On the south-west side are 41 and 43 Low Petergate, built in the 16th-century; 49 and 51 Low Petergate, with Mediaeval origins; 55 and 57 Low Petergate, both 17th-century; the 14th-century 67 Low Petergate; and then a timber-framed row, seven of which have their gable ends facing the street: 17th-century 71 Low Petergate, 16th-century 73, 75 and 77 Low Petergate, 14th-century 79 Low Petergate, 15th-century 81 Low Petergate, and 83 Low Petergate, built about 1600. 87 Low Petergate has 14th-century origins; 89 Low Petergate is 17th-century; and 91–93 Low Petergate has some 17th-century material.

References

 
Streets in York
Odonyms referring to religion